Dan Hayden in an American college baseball coach, currently serving as head coach of the Miami RedHawks baseball program.  He was named to that position prior to the 2014 season.

Hayden played baseball at Miami for one season before transferring to Xavier when coaching staffs changed.  After his college career, he served as Director of Baseball Operations and Volunteer Assistant Coach at Miami for one season each before earning a full-time assistant position at Xavier in 2011.  In July 2013, he was named head coach of the RedHawks.  The RedHawks home field, Hayden Park is named for Dan's grandfather, Joseph P. Hayden.

Head coaching record
Below is a table of Hayden's yearly records as an NCAA head baseball coach.

See also
List of current NCAA Division I baseball coaches

References

Living people
1984 births
Baseball catchers
Miami RedHawks baseball coaches
Miami RedHawks baseball players
Xavier Musketeers baseball players
Xavier Musketeers baseball coaches
Baseball players from Cincinnati